WW and C2 domain containing 2 (WWC2) is a protein that in humans is encoded by the WWC2 gene (4q35.1). Though function of WWC2 remains unknown, it has been predicted that WWC2 may play a role in cancer.

Gene 
Locus

The human gene WWC2 is found on chromosome 4 at band 4q35.1. The gene is found on the plus strand of the chromosome and is 8,822 base pairs long. The gene contains 23 exons. The WWC2 locus is quite complex and appears to produce several proteins with no sequence overlap

Aliases

A common alias of the gene is BH3-Only Member B (BOMB)

Homology 
Paralogs

There are two paralogs of WWC2 found in humans, WWC1 and WWC3. WWC1 is located on chromosome 5 and is a probable regulator of the Hippo signaling pathway that plays a role in tumor suppression by restricting proliferation and promoting apoptosis. WWC3 is located on chromosome X and not much is known about its function.

Orthologs

WWC2 is highly conserved in Mammalia, Aves, Reptilia, and Amphibia, as well as the rare coelacanth, which is more closely related to lungfish, reptiles, and mammals than ray finned fish. WWC2 is conserved in some Actinopterygii, Gastropoda, and Bivalvia. However, WWC2 is not well conserved in Insecta.

Protein 
Primary sequence

The gene encodes a protein also called WWC2 which is 1,192 amino acids long. The molecular weight of the protein is 133.9 kilodaltons. The protein is serine rich with no charge clusters, hydrophobic segments or transmembrane domains. The isoelectric point is 5.23800

Domains and motifs

WWC2 is a member of the WWC protein family which consists of a WW domain and a C2 domain.
WWC2 contains two WW domains and one C2 domain. WWC2 also contains two domains of unknown function, DUF342 and DUF444. A leucine zipper is located at position 854.

Post translational modifications

The WWC2 protein is predicted to be highly phosphorylated. There are 89 predicted sites of serine phosphorylation, 17 predicted sites of threonine phosphorylation, and 11 predicted sites of tyrosine phosphorylation. These numbers were relatively consistent in orthologous proteins.

It is also predicted that p38 mitogen-activated protein kinases and glycogen synthase kinase 3 bind at position T3, and casein kinase 2 binds at positions S13 and T50.

Expression 
Expression

WWC2 is expressed at a low level, and is tissue specific to the uterus, thyroid, lung, and liver. WWC2 expression is found to be elevated in the blastocyst and fetal stages of development.

Transcript variants

Many transcript variants exist for WWC2. Those that change a highly conserved amino acid residue, or surround a highly conserved amino acid residue are listed below:

Interacting proteins 
Transcription factors

Transcription factors with highest matrix scores that bind to sequences within the promoter (ID GXP_1499160) are shown below:
 STAT (signal transducer and activator of transcription)
 Muscle TATA box
 NOLF (neuron-specific olfactory factor)
 XCPE (X gene core promoter element 1)
 CTCF (CCCTC-binding factor)
 HDBP (Huntington's disease gene regulatory region)
 OCT1 (octamer binding protein)
 E2FF (E2F-myc activator cell cycle regulator)
 ZF57 (KRAB domain zinc finger protein 57)
 ZF07 (C2H2 zinc finger transcription factor 7)
 EGRF (EGR/nerve growth factor induced protein)
 CDEF (cell cycle dependent element - CDF-1 binding site)
 AP2F (activator protein 2)

Proteins

Potential interacting proteins include: YWHAZ, YWHAQ, RUVBL1, and REPS1.

Clinical significance and Current bioinformation 
While the exact function of WWC2 remains unknown, several mutations and variants of WWC2 have been researched in disease. A novel missense mutation in WWC2 was analyzed in Restless Leg Syndrome, but was not identified as a candidate gene. One study examined the role of Drosophila KIBRA (WWC1) in the Expanded-Hippo-Warts signaling cascade, which is involved with tumor suppression. The study stated that copy number aberration, translocation, and point mutations of WWC2, as well as other genes, should be further investigated in human cancers. WWC2 alias, BOMB, was researched in a grant suggesting that BOMB, along with two other genes (APOL6 and APOL1) promoted cell death in p53-null HCT116 cells.

References